Rafael del Pino y Moreno (and family) (born 10 November 1920 in Madrid, Spain; died 14 June 2008 in Madrid) was one of the wealthiest men in Europe. He had a net worth of approximately 8.6 billion US dollars in 2007. Del Pino founded the construction company Ferrovial in 1952, which became one of Spain's largest builders. He stepped down as President of Ferrovial in 2000, passing on the position to his son, Rafael del Pino Calvo-Sotelo, who now heads the business. He held an MBA from the MIT Sloan School of Management. In 2000 he founded the Fundación Rafael del Pino with the mission of developing future leaders. He was also member of IESE's International Advisory Board (IAB).

See also
List of billionaires (2007)

References

External links
 Fundación Rafael del Pino

1920 births
2008 deaths
Businesspeople from Madrid
MIT Sloan School of Management alumni
Spanish billionaires
Polytechnic University of Madrid alumni
20th-century Spanish businesspeople
21st-century Spanish businesspeople
Spanish expatriates in the United States